Matéri  is a town, arrondissement and commune in the Atakora Department of north-western Benin. The commune covers an area of 4740 square kilometres and as of 2013 had a population of 113,958 people.

References

Communes of Benin
Populated places in Benin
Arrondissements of Benin